Achille Manara (20 November 1827 – 15 February 1906) was an Italian prelate of the Catholic Church who became a bishop in 1879, a cardinal in 1895, and an archbishop in 1904.

Biography
Manara was born in Bologna on 20 November 1827. He was ordained a priest on 25 May 1850. He received a doctorate in theology from the Seminary of Bologna on 11 July 1851 and a doctorate in civil and canon law at the University of Bologna on 6 July 1855.

On 12 May 1879, Pope Leo XIII appointed him Bishop of Ancona-Humana. He received his episcopal consecration on 22 May from Cardinal Raffaele Monaco La Valletta, the Vicar General of Rome. Pope Leo raised him to the rank of cardinal on 29 November 1895, assigning him the title of San Pancrazio.

He participated in the 1903 conclave that elected Pope Pius X.

When the Diocese of Ancona-Humana became the Archdiocese of Ancona on 14 September 1904, he was promoted to archbishop.

He died in Ancona on 15 February 1906 at the age of 78.

References

External links
 
 

1827 births
1906 deaths
People from Bologna
Cardinals created by Pope Leo XIII